In the 2002 Cambodian League, Samart United won the championship.

References
RSSSF

C-League seasons
Cambodia
Cambodia
football